Blacktop Mojo is a rock band from Palestine, Texas. The band consists of lead vocalist Matt James, drummer Nathan Gillis, rhythm guitarist Chuck Wepfer, bassist Matt Curtis and lead guitarist Malcolm Booher.

The band was founded by Matt James and Nathan Gillis in 2012.

Discography

Studio albums 
 I Am (2014)
 Burn the Ships (2017)
 Under the Sun (2019)
 Blacktop Mojo (2021)

Extended plays 
 Static (2020)

Singles

Band members
Current members
 Matt James – lead vocals 
 Nathan Gillis – drums 
 Matt Curtis – bass, backing vocals 
 Chuck Wepfer – rhythm guitar  

Touring members
 Malcolm Booher – lead guitar, backing vocals 

Former members
 Ryan Kiefer – lead guitar 
 Kenneth Irwin – rhythm guitar 
 Chris Davis – bass

References 

Rock music groups from Texas
Musical groups established in 2012
Musical quintets
American post-grunge musical groups
People from Palestine, Texas